Sioux Township may refer to:

Sioux Township, Clay County, Iowa
Sioux Township, Lyon County, Iowa
Sioux Township, Monona County, Iowa
Sioux Township, Plymouth County, Iowa
Sioux Township, Sioux County, Iowa
Sioux Township, Platte County, Missouri
Sioux Township, McKenzie County, North Dakota

See also 

Sioux (disambiguation)

Township name disambiguation pages